Eugene Walter "Chick" Cichowski (born May 20, 1934) is a former American football cornerback in the National Football League for the Pittsburgh Steelers and the Washington Redskins.  He played college football at Indiana University and was drafted in the 21st round of the 1957 NFL Draft. He also played semi-pro football in the American Football Association (AFA) and in the Canadian Football League (CFL). He was inducted into the AFA Hall of Fame in 2009. He coached at New Trier high school in Illinois for 20 years with an overall record of 145–47–1. Cichowski was later inducted into the Illinois Football Coaches Association Hall of Fame. He recruited Clay Matthews Jr to play his Senior season at New Trier. He later went on to scout for the Baltimore Ravens and New York Jets.

1934 births
Living people
Indiana Hoosiers football players
American football cornerbacks
Pittsburgh Steelers players
Washington Redskins players
Players of American football from Chicago